Bloody Romance (Chinese: 媚者无疆) is a 2018 Chinese television series based on the novel of the same name by Banming Banmei (半明半寐). It airs on Youku on July 24, 2018 which stars Li Yitong and Qu Chuxiao as the leads. The series air internationally in 13 foreign countries via Youku and Dramafever.

The series was a commercial success and passed 600 million views online by August 2018. It was praised for its tight plot and high production quality despite a low budget, as well as for featuring a strong female lead.

Synopsis 
A story about a young woman who was exploited in the past, having gone through hell and back to become an assassin.

During the chaotic period towards the end of the Tang Dynasty, Qi Xue accidentally enters a mysterious city and was given the name Wan Mei. Tasked with dangerous missions, she puts herself in danger for each task but gains the protection of Chang An, a mysterious man, as a shadow. The two become embroiled in a greater conspiracy involving a deadly struggle for power.

Cast

Main 

 Li Yitong as Wan Mei / Su Qixue
 An 18-year-old girl sold to Qinglou Brothel by her father for 2 bags of rice. Picked by Yue Ying and named Wan Mei to be the 14th leader of Gui Hua City in the end.
 Qu Chuxiao as Chang An / Xie Huan
 Wan Mei's Shadow. A descendant of Tang's Dynasty imperial clan, hailing from the lineage of Princess Taiping. The Xie family saved him so that he could revive the former Tang Dynasty as the rightful successor using the Wordless Steel left by Wu Zetian.

Supporting 

 Wang Duo as Gong Zi
 Gui Hua City's true leader and the Duke of Ning, who has long been blind and lived with Yue Ying since childhood when his mother died.
 Yanting Ma as Yue Ying
 Supreme assassin who has always been supporting Gong Zi since young. No bleeding record in story except cutting her palm for Gong Zi.
 Jill Hsu as Cha Luo
 The 13th leader of Gui Hua City, likes Xing Feng and hates Wan Mei.
 Li Zifeng as Xing Feng
 Cha Luo's loyal shadow, likes Cha Luo.
 Puff Kuo as Liu Guang
 Skilled assassin under Cha Luo who likes Chang An. 
 Liu Mengmeng as You Chan
 Only survivor of Ding Shan Clan when Xue Lian Jiao assassinated the clan.
 Wang Yifan as Lan Ruo
 Yue Qingya's adopted son, Xue Lian Jiao's temporary leader. Likes You Chan.
 Gao Xin as Chen Mo
 Physician. Wan Mei's first target for assassination.

Production
The series is produced by established director. Xu Jizhou, as well as Zhang Wei. Guo Yong (Ip Man) is the martial arts director while Di Kun (Love O2O) is the production/arts director.

Soundtrack 

Bloody Romance Original Soundtrack was released with 31 tracks over 2 discs, with instrumentals composed by Dong Dongdong.

Awards and nominations

References

External links 

 

2018 web series debuts
Chinese web series
Youku original programming
Chinese wuxia television series
Television shows based on Chinese novels
2018 Chinese television series debuts
2018 Chinese television series endings
Television series set in the Five Dynasties and Ten Kingdoms period
Fantasy adventure web series